Giancarlo Giorgetti (born 16 December 1966) is an Italian politician and prominent member of the League, of which he became deputy secretary in 2016. Since October 2022, Giorgetti is serving as Minister of Economy and Finance in the government of Giorgia Meloni. Previously, he was Secretary of the Council of Ministers from June 2018 until September 2019, in the government of Giuseppe Conte and later Minister of Economic Development from February 2021 until October 2022, in the government of Mario Draghi.

Early life and career 
Giorgetti was born in 1966 in Cazzago Brabbia, a small town in the Province of Varese. He later graduated in business economics at the Bocconi University, becoming a tax advisor and financial auditor.

During the university he was close to the Youth Front, the youth-wing of the nationalist Italian Social Movement (MSI). However, in the early 1990s, he joined Lega Lombarda and Lega Nord, the separatist movements founded by Umberto Bossi, and on 23 April 1995 he was elected mayor of his hometown, Cazzago Brabbia, a position that he held until 12 June 2004.

Political career 
Elected to the Chamber of Deputies for the first time in 1996 Italian general election, he was re-elected in 2001, 2006, 2008, 2013 and 2018. From 2001 to 2006, he was the chairman of the Budget Committee in the Chamber. Within the party, he was national secretary of Lega Lombarda from 2002 to 2012 and has been deputy federal secretary of Lega Nord since 2016.

Giorgetti was described by The New York Times as a powerful aide to Umberto Bossi, founder and federal secretary of Lega Nord from 1991 to 2012; and by The Economist as his "dauphin". In 2010, The Guardian described him as an "influential member of Berlusconi's Lega Nord party", where Berlusconi stood erroneously for Bossi. Under Matteo Salvini, Bossi's opponent and new federal secretary of Lega Nord since 2013, Giorgetti continued to be one of the most influential members of the party.

Political views and controversies 
Giorgetti is a federalist and regionalist politician who supports decentralization. Speaking at the 2018 edition of the Communion and Liberation's Rimini Meeting on 20 August 2018, he addressed the rise of populism, stating that "the Italian Parliament doesn't matter anymore because it's no longer understood by citizens, who see it as a place of political inconclusiveness". In 2006, Giorgetti found himself at the center of a controversy for having refused in 2004 a 50–100,000 euro bribe from Italian banker Gianpiero Fiorani.

Giorgetti is a vocal supporter of a first-past-the-post based electoral system and pushes for a return to the Italian electoral law of 1993 (Mattarellum), although it was repealed in favor of the Italian electoral law of 2005 (Porcellum, subsequently declared unconstitutional) with Lega Nord's support. In 2020, Giorgetti argued that Italy needs an electoral system that "makes possible to govern. Of all the electoral systems I've known, the one that worked best is Mattarellum", saying that "local mayors, entrepreneurs, professionals and people representing their own territory were brought into nationwide politics thanks to FPTP's single-member districts mechanism".

Electoral history

First-past-the-post elections

References

External links

1966 births
20th-century Italian politicians
21st-century Italian politicians
Bocconi University alumni
Conte I Cabinet
Draghi Cabinet
Deputies of Legislature XVIII of Italy
Deputies of Legislature XVII of Italy
Deputies of Legislature XVI of Italy
Deputies of Legislature XV of Italy
Deputies of Legislature XIV of Italy
Deputies of Legislature XIII of Italy
Italian neo-fascists
Lega Nord politicians
Living people
People from the Province of Varese
Meloni Cabinet
Finance ministers of Italy
Government ministers of Italy